Marlene Daudén (born 1941 in the Philippines) is considered one of the greatest Filipina drama actresses of all time. She achieved her legendary status as a film thespian during her film career that spanned from the 1950s up to the 1970s. During the height of her fame, she was one of the most bankable stars of Sampaguita Pictures, which used to be one of the leading Philippine movie studios of the era.

Born to a Spanish-Irish father and a Spanish mother, Marlene graduated from Saint Scholastica's College in León Guinto Street, Malate, Manila. In the beginning, she was entirely a stranger to Tagalog, then the main language used for mainstream Filipino movies because Marlene only spoke English at school and Spanish at home. When she was discovered, this proved to be the one hurdle she had to overcome before becoming a bankable star. Nevertheless, with the help of Rosa Mía and her sacrifices from attending social functions while memorizing her Tagalog lines in between filming sessions, she was able to ace her acting career.

Marlene started out doing bit parts until she was cast in heavy supporting roles such as the black sheep sister of Paraluman in Anino ni Bathala in 1958, where she won her first the Filipino Academy of Movie Arts and Sciences (FAMAS) Award. With her newfound popularity and her recent FAMAS victory, she was then cast as the lead star in her first leading role in the movie Rosa Rossini. After Sampaguita Pictures declined in the 1960s, she became a freelance actress, giving her more freedom to choose more challenging dramatic roles and winning awards in the process.

Marlene will forever be remembered in Philippine film history as the first Filipina thespian ever to win five acting awards from the Filipino Academy of Movie Arts and Sciences (FAMAS), which was the only film award-giving body in the Philippines during her time. She won Best Supporting Actress for her roles in the films Anino ni Bathala, Kamandag, and Sapagkat Kami'y Tao Lamang. She also won two Best Actress awards for the films Sa Bawat Pintig ng Puso and Kapag Puso'y Sinugatan. She was also nominated by the FAMAS for an additional time: Best Actress for Mila Rosa, which she won. She was nominated for Best Actress in Alipin ng Busabos and Babae, Ikaw ang Dahilan, which she won again.

Marlene made her last film in 1978 entitled Kung Kaya Mo, Kaya Ko Rin with Christopher de Leon, after which she went home to the United States. She also appeared in Combat Killers with Leopoldo Salcedo and the film was released as a class B movie in the United States.  She is currently married to former De La Salle Green Archer basketball star Ernesto "Nonggoy" Hernaez, with whom she has three children. They now reside in California.

Her granddaughter Ciera Mertens is a former beauty queen.

Filmography
1957 - Mga Ligaw na Bulaklak
1957 - Gabi at Araw
1957 - Eternally
1958 - Kundiman ng Puso
1958 - Anino ni Bathala
1958 - Silveria
1958 - Mapait na Lihim
1958 - Berdaderong Ginto
1958 - Alaalang Banal
1958 - Anino ni Bathala
1959 - Kamandag
1959 - Rosa Rossini
1960 - Gumuhong Bantayog
1963 - Sapagkat Kami'y Tao Lamang
1964 - Sa Bawat Pintig ng Puso
1965 - Mía Rosa
1968 - Alipin ng Busabos
1968 - Combat Killers
1972 - Babae, Ikaw ang Dahilan
1978 - Kung Kaya Mo, Kaya Ko Rin

References

External links

 The Unofficial FAMAS Awards Website
 Kabayan Central-Classic Tagalog Movies

Filipino emigrants to the United States
Filipino television personalities
Filipino people of Irish descent
Filipino people of Spanish descent
Living people
20th-century Filipino actresses
Filipino film actresses
Filipino television actresses
1941 births
St. Scholastica's College Manila alumni